Road to Istanbul is a 2016 French-Algerian drama film directed by Rachid Bouchareb. It was shown in the Panorama section at the 66th Berlin International Film Festival. Whettnall received a Magritte Award for Best Actress at the 7th Magritte Awards for her role in the film. It was selected as the Algerian entry for the Best Foreign Language Film at the 90th Academy Awards, but it was not nominated.

Plot
Elisabeth sets off to find her daughter, who has joined the Islamic State in Syria.

Cast
 Astrid Whettnall as Elisabeth
 Pauline Burlet as Elodie
 Patricia Ide as Julie
 Abel Jafri as Turkish policeman

Production
The film was shot in Belgium, Istanbul and Algeria.

See also
 List of submissions to the 90th Academy Awards for Best Foreign Language Film
 List of Algerian submissions for the Academy Award for Best Foreign Language Film

References

External links
 

2016 films
2016 drama films
French drama films
2010s French-language films
Films directed by Rachid Bouchareb
Algerian drama films
2010s French films